Pat or Patrick McDonald may refer to:

 Pat McDonald (actress) (1921–1990), Australian actress
 Pat McDonald (politician) (born 1943), member of the Vermont House of Representatives
 Pat McDonald (shot putter) (1878–1954), American athlete
 Patrick McDonald (curler) (born 1967), American wheelchair curler
 Patrick McDonald (director), artistic director of the Green Thumb Theatre, Vancouver, British Columbia, Canada
 Patrick McDonald (politician), member of the Idaho House of Representatives
 Patrick Range McDonald, American journalist and author
 P. J. McDonald (Patrick Joseph McDonald, born 1982), Irish jockey

See also
Pat MacDonald (disambiguation)